The Wrench, published in the U.S. under the title of The Monkey's Wrench, is a novel by Primo Levi that takes the form a collection of interconnected stories exchanged between the two main characters. It is similar in form to his collection of connected memoir stories, The Periodic Table.

First published as La Chiave a Stella by Einaudi in 1978, the book was written after Levi had retired from the family paint business SIVA. It takes the form of an interview by a chemist of a rigger. They are both working in a remote work camp where there is little to do in the evenings except tell stories. The scene is loosely based upon Togliattigrad, the Fiat camp set up in Russia to build a car factory. The rigger is Libertino Faussone and the chemist is clearly autobiographical.

Stories
The job of a rigger is to set up cranes and scaffolding and to manage major mechanical projects. One of Faussone's jobs is to sort out a problem with an acetic acid separation column which goes through a cycle of making loud noises and shaking, before settling down again. It turns out the ceramic contents of the column have disintegrated and have formed a sludge at the bottom. This is precisely what happened at SIVA to a column that Levi designed.

The story, one of many in the book, is about troubleshooting, and the forensic investigation skills needed to solve industrial problems. The skills include being able to assess the facts of a failure, analyse them in the light of the product design, and once the root cause has been identified, act to correct the mistake or mistakes so as to prevent further events of the same kind.

Levi always felt that satisfying work was essential for a happy life, and the honest hands-on work of someone who also used his intellect was the highest form of work. Faussone was his ideal. Life is a series of problems which one has to use one's brains and one's hands to resolve.

1978 novels
Novels by Primo Levi
Strega Prize-winning works
Giulio Einaudi Editore books